Tetyana Ivanyushkyna (born 18 September 1966) is a former Ukrainian volleyball player.

She was part of the Ukraine women's national volleyball team at the 1996 Summer Olympics.
On club level she played with Iskra Lugansk.

Clubs
 Iskra Lugansk (1994)

References

External links
 
 
 

1966 births
Living people
Ukrainian women's volleyball players
Olympic volleyball players of Ukraine
Volleyball players at the 1996 Summer Olympics
Place of birth missing (living people)